Shahriyar Kabir (born 20 November 1950) is a Bangladeshi journalist, filmmaker, human rights activist, and author of more than 70 books focusing on human rights, communism, fundamentalism, history, and the Bangladesh war of independence. He was awarded Bangla Academy Literary Award in 1995.

Early life and education

Kabir was born in Feni district, Chittagong Division, East Pakistan and now in Bangladesh on 20 November 1950. He attended St Gregory's School. He passed his higher secondary exam from Jagannath College. He was a student of the Department of Bengali at the University of Dhaka. Shariar Kabir was one of the prominent activists of Swadhin Bangla Betar Kendra in Kolkata during Liberation War. He helped to write  inspiring script & poems for freedom fighter during the war which were played in Swadhin Bangla Betar Kendra. Then  he was a student of Bengali Department of the University of Dhaka. He started his writings for teenagers and juveniles when he was a university student. After the war, he joined as a journalist in the Daily Bangla and also in the Weekly Bichitra.  He was the one of the main Editor of Weekly Bichitra, which played a vital role for the punishment of liberation war criminals.  From 1976 to 1980 he became the general secretary of the organization Bangladesh Lekhak Shibir.

Career

In January 1992, Ekattorer Ghatak Dalal Nirmul Committee (Committee for Resisting Killers and Collaborators of Bangladesh Liberation War of 71) was formed by 101 people. This committee called for the trial of people who committed crimes against humanity in the 1971 Bangladesh Liberation War in collaboration with the Pakistan Army. The Ghatak-Dalal Nirmul Committee set up mock trials in Dhaka in March 1992 known as Gono Adalot (Court of the people) and 'sentenced' persons they accused of being war criminals.
Jahanara Imam and 24 others were charged with treason. This charge was, however, dropped in 1996 after her death by the Chief advisor Mohammed Habibur Rahman of the Caretaker government of that time.

Kabir played a major role in formation of Nirmul Committee. The people's court set up by the Ekattorer Ghatak-Dalal Nirmul Committee led by Jahanara Imam was deemed unlawful by the Government of Bangladesh. After the death of Jahanara Imam, he became the acting president of Ghatak Dalal Nirmul Committee.

Kabir has been active for years as a journalist writing about human rights in Bangladesh. He was arrested twice in the early 2000s for what the government considered illegal attacks. He was first arrested in November 2001, after the government of Khaleda Zia of the Bangladesh National Party had come to power. The government charged him with sedition and "tarnishing the image of the government" because he was investigating attacks on the Hindu minority from October to December 2001 and accused minister of Bangladesh Jamaat-e-Islami of taking part in war crimes during Bangladesh Liberation War. Many Hindus had been intimidated and attacked by party workers during that period in an effort to keep them away from the polls, as they generally did not vote for the Islamist parties. Kabir was documenting accounts by the survivors. He was then released on bail in January 2002. In February 2002, a bomb was thrown at a reception for him in Chittagong Press Club, killing one bystander.

Kabir was arrested again in December 2002 . As the head of the Nirmul Committee, which he founded in 1992 to work for prosecution of those responsible for genocide and other war crimes during the Bangladesh War of Independence in 1971, Kabir has continued to take an active role. Observers said that the BNP was threatened as its principal political partner, Bangladesh Jamaat-e-Islami has leaders who have been alleged to have participated as in paramilitary forces against liberation in 1971, which the party opposed. When the High Court ruled on 4 January 2003 that Kabir's detention without charges was illegal, the government held him for an additional 90 days under the Armed Forces (Special Powers) Act.

He has alleged that Ghulam Azam, a former leader of Jamaat e Islami at the time of the liberation war, had played an important role in the mass killings of the 1971 conflict, as had Jamaat as a group. He has also said that the Razakars were founded by the Jamaat e Islami leader, Maulana A.K.M. Yusuf. Kabir has supported efforts by the Awami League-led government, which won a two-thirds majority in the Parliament in December 2008, to establish an International Crimes Tribunal in 2009 to prosecute war crimes. The first trials were completed in early 2013, with three men convicted who have been prominent in Jamaat since the liberation war, which the party opposed. Afterwards he called for a ban on the Jamaat-e-Islami party. Ghulam Azam was also convicted by the International Crimes Tribunal.

Shahriyar Kabir is also a very popular author for children and young adult's adventure book genre. He has penned many books like Nuliachorir Shonar Pahar, Abuder Adventure, Carpathian er Kalo Golap etc.

Criticism
Shahriar Kabir did not take part in the liberation war according to 'Letters written in memory of Jahanara Imam' written by Mushtari Shafi, former convener of the Committee for the Elimination of Killer Brokers of 1971, and Shahriar Kabir was mentioned as a supplier of chickens to Pakistani army camps during the war.
Shahriar Kabir has denied these allegations.

Works

Documentaries 
 "Juddhaporadh '71" (2008)
 Muktijudder Gaan(মুক্তিযুদ্ধের গান)
 Cry for justice

Publications 
 Puber Surjo (পূবের সূর্য) (Juvenile novel), Calcutta 1972, 
 Nuliachhoriyr Sonar Pahar (নুলিয়াছড়ির সোনার পাহাড়) (Juvenile novel), Dhaka 1976
 Hariye Jayor Thikana (হারিয়ে যাওয়ার ঠিকানা) (Juvenine novel), Dhaka 1976
 Comrade Mao Tse-Tung (কমরেড মাও সে তুং) (Biography), Dhaka 1977
 Abuder Adventure (আবুদের এডভেঞ্চার) (collection of juvenile stories), Dhaka 1983
 Ekatturer Jishu (একাত্তরের যীশু) (collection of short stories), Dhaka 1986, 
 Oder Janiye Dao (ওদের জানিয়ে দাও) (novel), Dhaka 1986,
 Janaika Protaroker Kahini (জনৈক প্রতারকের কাহিনী) (collection of short stories), Dhaka 1987,
 Simante Sanghat (সীমান্তে সংঘাত) (juvenile novel), Dhaka 1988,
 Enver Hozar Smriti (ইনভের হযার স্মৃতি) (Reminiscence of Enver Hoxa of Albania), Dhaka 1988,
 Hanabareer Rohos (হানাবাড়ির রহস্য) (Juvenile novel), Dhaka 1989,
 Nicolas Rozarior Chhelera (নিকোলাস রোজারিওর ছেলেরা) (Juvenile novel), Dhaka 1989, 
 Michhiler akjon (মিছিলের একজন) (collection of short stories), Dhaka 1989,
 Pathariar Khoni Rohoshyo (পাথারিয়ার খনি রহস্য) (Juvenile novel), Dhaka 1989,
 Maolana Bhashani (মাওলানা ভাসানি) (Biography), Dhaka 1989, 
 Mohabipad Sanket (মহাবিপদ সংকেত) (collection of short stories), Dhaka 1990,
 From Balkan to Batlic (Travelogue), Dhaka 1990,
 Bangladeshe Samprodaikatar chalchitra (বাংলাদেশে সাম্প্রদায়িক চালচিত্র) (Non fiction), Dhaka 1993.
 Sadhu Gregorir Dinguli (সাধু গ্রেগরির দিনগুলি) (autobiography), Dhaka 1994,
 Bangladeshe Moulobad-O-Sangkhaloghhu Samprodye (বাংলাদেশে মৌলবাদ ও সংখ্যালঘু সম্প্রদায়) (Essay), Dhaka 1995,
 Sheikh Mujib-O-Muktijudhher Chetona (শেখ মুজিব ও মুক্তিযুদ্ধের চেতনা) (Essay), Dhaka 1997,
 Shantir Pathye Ashanto Parbottyo Chattogram (শান্তির পথে অশান্ত পার্বত্য চট্রগ্রাম) (Essay), Dhaka 1998,
 Kashmirer Akashey Moulobader Kalomegh (কাশ্মিরের আকাশে মৌলবাদের কালমেঘ) (Essay), 1999,
 Muktijuddher Brittyobondi Itihash (মুক্তিযুদ্ধের বৃত্তবন্দী ইতিহাস) (Essay), Dhaka 2000,
 Ekattorer Gonohattya O Juddhaporddhider Bichar (একাত্তরের গণহত্যা ও যুদ্ধাপরাধিদের বিচার)  (Essay), Dhaka 2001, 
 Dakshin Asiaye Moulobad (দক্ষিণ এশিয়ায় মৌলবাদ) (Essay), Dhaka 2001, 
 Pakistan Theke phirey (পাকিস্তান থেকে ফিরে) (Travelogue), Dhaka 2002,
 Bangladeshe Shamprodayik Nirjaton (বাংলাদেশে সাম্প্রদায়িক নির্যাতন) (Essay), Dhaka 2002,
 Bangladeshe Manobadhikar O Shamprodayekota (বাংলাদেশে মানবাধিকার ও সাম্প্রদায়িকতা) (Essay) Dhaka-2003,
 Abaruddhyo Shawdesh Theke (অবরুদ্ধ স্বদেশ থেকে)  (Travelogue), Dhaka 2003, 
 My Sojourn in Pakistan (Travelogue) Dhaka-2003.

Edited books 
 Genocide 71 (Ed. jointly with Prof. Ahmed Sharif & Prof. Serajul Islam Chowdhury), Dhaka 1989, 
 Bangladesh Genocide After Twenty Years (Ed. jointly with Frank Kerrigon), New York, 1994, 
 Resist Fundamentalism : Focus on Bangladesh, Dhaka, 1995, 
 White Paper : Repression on Religious Minority, Dhaka, 1996. 
 Tormenting Seventy One Dhaka, 1999.

See also
 International Crimes Tribunal (Bangladesh)

References

Further reading
 Boi Mela : http://www.boi-mela.com/Booklist.asp?author=169
 IISG: http://www.iisg.nl/news/shahriar1.php

1950 births
Living people
Bangladeshi film directors
Bangladeshi human rights activists
Bangladeshi journalists
Muslim reformers
Recipients of Bangla Academy Award
St. Gregory's High School and College alumni